Where Is Freedom? is a 1954 Italian comedy-drama film directed by Roberto Rossellini. 
 
The film had a troubled production because, after shooting some scenes, Rossellini lost interest in the film and abandoned the set. The work was completed after about a year, mainly from Mario Monicelli, with some scenes also shot by Lucio Fulci and Federico Fellini. Despite that, Rossellini is the sole credited director of the film.

Plot 
Difficulties and troubles of an ex-convict. Embittered and disillusioned by life, he will soon plan his return to prison.

Cast 
Totò: Salvatore Lo Jacono 
Vera Molnar: Agnesina 
Nita Dover: marathon dancer
Franca Faldini: Maria 
Leopoldo Trieste: Abramo Piperno 
Antonio Nicotra: marshal #1 
Salvo Libassi: marshal #2 
Giacomo Rondinella: prisoner
Ugo D'Alessio: judge
Mario Castellani: public prosecutor 
Vincenzo Talarico: defense attorney
Pietro Carloni: Pietro

References

External links

   

1954 films
Italian comedy-drama films
1954 comedy-drama films
Films directed by Roberto Rossellini
Commedia all'italiana
Films set in Rome
Films produced by Dino De Laurentiis
Films produced by Carlo Ponti
Films scored by Renzo Rossellini
1950s Italian-language films
Italian black-and-white films
1950s Italian films